Palapatti Sadaya Goundar Kailasam (12 September 1915―10 August 1986) was a former Chief Justice of Madras High Court and Judge of the Supreme Court of India.

Career
Kailasam was born in a Zamindar family of Salem district, Tamil Nadu. He passed B.Sc. in Botany from Presidency College, Madras in 1935. In 1937, he completed his law degree from Madras Law College. He was appointed Public Prosecutor of Madras High Court in 1960 and also worked as acting Advocate general for few days. Kailasam became the permanent judge of this High Court on 20 October 1960 and was elevated to the post of Chief Justice on 8 April 1976. Justice Kailasam was appointed Judge of Supreme Court in 1977 as the first Chief Justice of Madras who accepted the appointment to Supreme Court of India. He retired on 12 September 1980.

Family
Justice Kailasam married rewound Tamil poet Smt. Soundra Kailasam. Their daughter's name is Nalini Chidambaram, wife of P. Chidambaram, former Union Minister of India.

References

1915 births
1986 deaths
Presidency College, Chennai alumni
Judges of the Madras High Court
Chief Justices of the Madras High Court
Justices of the Supreme Court of India
People from Salem district
20th-century Indian judges
20th-century Indian lawyers